Hackney City Farm is a city farm and private alternative school in Haggerston in the London Borough of Hackney. It is situated at the junction of Hackney Road and Goldsmith's Row.

The farm was established in 1984 as a community and educational resource and to give borough residents, particularly young people, experience of animals. The facilities at Hackney City Farm include a farmyard, area for grazing, garden and a tree nursery with butterfly house. The amenity encourages children to learn about the natural environment, growing vegetables and caring for animals. The farm is home to a range of animals, including poultry, sheep, rabbits, bees, pigs and a donkey. Animals can be adopted at the farm, and free range eggs are for sale.

Hackney City Farm is a registered charity and a company limited by guarantee. It runs educational projects, exhibitions, courses in crafts and farm trails, and operates a café, Frizzante, which won a Time Out award for best family restaurant in 2004. In 2008, the cycling shop Bike Yard East opened in the farm, selling cycle products and offering repairs.

In 2015 Hackney City Farm registered with Ofsted as a private alternative school. The farm has places for up to 10 pupils aged 13 to 17.

References

External links
Hackney City Farm website

Growing Communities

1984 establishments in England
Alternative schools in England
Charities based in London
City farms in London
Educational institutions established in 1984
Haggerston
Private co-educational schools in London
Private schools in the London Borough of Hackney
Parks and open spaces in the London Borough of Hackney